Melba Yurany Avendaño Romero (born 5 January 1993) is a Colombian artistic gymnast. She represents her nation at international competitions, including at the 2015 World Artistic Gymnastics Championships.

References

1993 births
Living people
Colombian female artistic gymnasts
Place of birth missing (living people)
Gymnasts at the 2015 Pan American Games
Pan American Games competitors for Colombia
Central American and Caribbean Games silver medalists for Colombia
Competitors at the 2014 Central American and Caribbean Games
South American Games silver medalists for Colombia
South American Games bronze medalists for Colombia
South American Games medalists in gymnastics
Competitors at the 2010 South American Games
Competitors at the 2014 South American Games
Competitors at the 2018 South American Games
Central American and Caribbean Games medalists in gymnastics
21st-century Colombian women